The UC Riverside Highlanders women's basketball team represents the University of California, Riverside in Riverside, California, United States. The school's team currently competes in the Big West Conference. They play their home games at the Student Recreation Center Arena.

History
The Highlanders have appeared in the NCAA Tournament three times since joining Division I, making it in 2006, 2007, and 2010 after winning the Big West title. They have also made the WNIT in 2009, 2011, and 2016.

Year by Year Records

Postseason results

NCAA Division I
The Highlanders have made three appearances in the NCAA Division I women's basketball tournament. They have a combined record of 0–3.

NCAA Division II
The Highlanders made three appearances in the NCAA Division II women's basketball tournament. They had a combined record of 0–3.

AIAW Division I
The Highlanders made one appearance in the AIAW National Division I basketball tournament, with a combined record of 1–2.

References

External links